Wheelwright is a home rule-class city in Floyd County, Kentucky, United States. The population was 780 at the 2010 census, down from 1,042 in 2000.

History
Founded by the Elk Horn Coal Company in 1916, it was named for the company's president at that time, Jere H. Wheelwright. Elk Horn leased its mines from the Consolidation Coal. In 1930, Consolidation sold the Wheelwright coal camp to Inland Steel. In 1966, Inland Steel sold the camp to Island Creek Coal. The mine closed in the 1970s. After the mine was abandoned, the Kentucky Housing Corporation purchased the town, rehabilitated the homes, and sold the homes to residents.

Wheelwright was home to one of the pack horse libraries in the 1930s and early 1940s.

Geography
Wheelwright is located at the southern end of Floyd County at  (37.331465, -82.719064), in the valley of the Right Fork Otter Creek.

There is just one way in and out of the city, via the Junction Bridge, located in Bypro, also referred to as "Wheelwright Junction", on state route 122. The original metal structure was replaced by concrete in 1959. This bridge is now known as the Timothy Hall Memorial Bridge, in honor of City Commissioner Timothy Hall, who died in a car crash.

Demographics

As of the census of 2000, there were 1,042 people, 203 households, and 146 families residing in the city. The racial makeup of the city was 63.15% White, 34.74% African American, 0.10% Asian, 1.25% from other races, and 0.77% from two or more races. Hispanic or Latino of any race were 1.73% of the population.

There were 203 households, out of which 36.0% had children under the age of 18 living with them, 53.7% were married couples living together, 16.3% had a female householder with no husband present, and 27.6% were non-families. 26.1% of all households were made up of individuals, and 10.3% had someone living alone who was 65 years of age or older. The average household size was 2.53 and the average family size was 3.08.

In the city, the population was spread out, with 13.7% under the age of 18, 22.7% from 18 to 24, 43.4% from 25 to 44, 13.6% from 45 to 64, and 6.5% who were 65 years of age or older. The median age was 29 years. For every 100 females, there were 290.3 males. For every 100 females age 18 and over, there were 330.1 males.

The median income for a household in the city was $14,808, and the median income for a family was $20,625. Males had a median income of $30,625 versus $16,563 for females. The per capita income for the city was $5,367. About 36.8% of families and 40.0% of the population were below the poverty line, including 47.0% of those under the age of 18 and 11.6% of those ages 65 and older.
As of the census in 2014, there were 556 people left in the city of Wheelwright

Government

Wheelwright is governed by a city commission form of government. Its current mayor is Don "Booty" Hall. The city commission consists of Bobby W. Akers, Sam Little Jr., Dana McCown, and Vernon Smallwood.

Education
Floyd County's public schools are operated by Floyd County Schools. Most students residing in the city of Wheelwright attend:
 South Floyd Elementary School
 Floyd Central High School

Prison
The Corrections Corporation of America (now CoreCivic)-owned Otter Creek Correctional Center in Wheelwright closed in 2012, due in part to a riot by Indiana prisoners in 2001, and subsequent widespread sexual abuse of women inmates. The prison, renamed the Southeast State Correctional Complex and operated by the Kentucky Department of Corrections under a lease from CoreCivic,  reopened as a male facility in September 2020.

References

External links
 Guide to the Bill Kephart collection on Wheelwright (Ky.), 1978-1980 housed at the University of Kentucky Libraries Special Collections Research Center
 Guide to the Wheelwright Collection, 1916-1979 housed at the University of Kentucky Libraries Special Collections Research Center (includes digitized materials)

Cities in Floyd County, Kentucky
Populated places established in 1916
Company towns in Kentucky
Coal towns in Kentucky
1916 establishments in Kentucky
Cities in Kentucky